The United Nations Educational, Scientific and Cultural Organization (UNESCO) World Heritage Sites are places of importance to cultural or natural heritage as described in the UNESCO World Heritage Convention, established in 1972. Iceland accepted the convention on 19 December 1995, making its natural and cultural sites eligible for inclusion on the list.

, Iceland has three sites inscribed on the list. The first site added to the list was the Þingvellir National Park, in 2004. Two further sites were added later, Surtsey in 2008 and Vatnajökull National Park in 2019. Þingvellir is a cultural site while the other two are natural sites.

In addition to its World Heritage Sites, Iceland also maintains six properties on its tentative list. The existing site of Þingvellir is listed on the tentative list twice, as a proposal to extend the cultural site to include the natural heritage, and as a part of a new transnational nomination to cover the Viking heritage.



World Heritage Sites 
UNESCO lists sites under ten criteria; each entry must meet at least one of the criteria. Criteria i through vi are cultural, and vii through x are natural.

Tentative list
In addition to sites inscribed on the World Heritage List, member states can maintain a list of tentative sites that they may consider for nomination. Nominations for the World Heritage List are only accepted if the site was previously listed on the tentative list. As of 2019, Iceland has six on its tentative list.

References

Iceland
World Heritage Sites in Iceland
Protected areas of Iceland
World Heritage Sites
World Heritage Sites